The men's decathlon event at the 1987 Pan American Games was held in Indianapolis, United States on 12 and 13 August.

Results

References

Athletics at the 1987 Pan American Games
1987